Ruggero Ruggeri (14 November 1871 – 20 July 1953) was an Italian stage and film actor. Ruggeri was a celebrated theatre actor, appearing alongside Lyda Borelli on stage in 1909. From 1914 onward he sporadically made films in both the silent and sound eras.

Selected filmography
 Hamlet (1917)
 The Prince of the Impossible (1918)
 The Beautiful Wife (1924)
 Queen of the Night (1931)
 The Widow (1939)
 The Document (1939)
 The Betrothed (1941)
 Jealousy (1942)
 Vanity (1947)
 The Temptress (1952)
 The Little World of Don Camillo (1952, voice)
 The Return of Don Camillo (1953, voice)

References

External links

Bibliography
 Dalle Vacche, Angela. Diva: Defiance and Passion in Early Italian Cinema. University of Texas Press, 2008.

1871 births
1953 deaths
Italian male stage actors
Italian male film actors
Italian male silent film actors
People from Fano
20th-century Italian male actors